The Box is a BBC cooking game show that has aired on BBC One from 25 May to 26 June 2015, and is hosted by James Martin. It follows a two round format with a celebrity guest to establish a "Cook of the Day".

International broadcast
Internationally, the series premiered in Australian on 16 November 2015, on LifeStyle Food.

References

External links
 
 

2010s British game shows
2015 British television series debuts
2015 British television series endings
BBC television game shows
Television series by Banijay